Sensen may refer to:
 Sen-Sen, a type of breath freshener 
 Datengoku Sensen, Ali Project's 26th single

People
 Oliver Sensen, German philosopher